Thorben-Johannes Deters (born 20 August 1995) is a German footballer who plays as a midfielder for Preußen Münster.

Thorben is the son of Bernd Deters, who also played for SV Meppen as a defender for the entirety of his senior career.

References

External links
 Thorben Deters on FuPa.net
 

1995 births
Living people
People from Meppen
German footballers
Association football midfielders
SV Meppen players
Lüneburger SK Hansa players
VfB Lübeck players
SC Preußen Münster players
Regionalliga players
3. Liga players
Footballers from Lower Saxony